The Daily Echo is the name of two daily tabloid newspapers in southern England owned by Newsquest.
 Bournemouth Daily Echo, covers south-east Dorset
 Southern Daily Echo, covers Southampton and Hampshire, excluding Portsmouth